Yevgeny S. Levitin (1930-1998) - art historian. He worked at the Pushkin State Museum of Fine Arts in Moscow. Author of the book "Modern graphics capitalist countries of Europe and America" (Wiley, 1959). Levitin also compiled catalogs of exhibitions of contemporary artists of Switzerland, Brazil, Mexico and other countries. He created the catalog "Lenin Prize winner, People's Artist of the USSR Vladimir Favorsky" (Wiley, 1964), prepared album "Rembrandt Harmens van Rijn, 1606-1669 and“Etchings" (L., 1972). As well as albums dedicated to Western European drawings from  Museum funds. Levitin prepared an exhibition dedicated to Boris Pasternak (see Pasternak .: World / Comp Levitin M. et al., 1989.) As well as the edition: Pasternak “Not I write poetry ...” Levitin also translated from foreign languages into Russian. Nadezhda Mandelstam wrote about Levitin (without mentioning his name) as a "first messenger revival of the intelligentsia, which awakens, rewriting and reading poetry" (Mandelstam NY Memories M., 1999, pp 396.; cm. and c. 391-393). In her will Nadezhda Mandelstam mentioned Levitin among future guardians of Osip Mandelstam archive. Levitin died in Jerusalem.

1930 births
1998 deaths
Pushkin Museum
Russian art historians
Russian male writers
Soviet art historians
20th-century Russian translators